Bsous is a village in the Aley District of Mount Lebanon with an estimated population of 6,000. It is located 200 to 730 meters above sea level and 14 kilometres from the capital, Beirut. It is both a summer resort as well as being inhabited during the winter months. This is due to its proximity to Beirut. The name "Bsous" derives from the Syriac.

Agriculture
Figue de barbarie, abricot, vigne, mure, olive

Religion
The Maronite Catholic parish of Our Lady of Bsous is part of the Beirut diocese and has two churches:

 Notre Dame de Bsous
 St. Antoine de Padova

The Greek Orthodox parish of Bsous is part of the Mount Lebanon diocese and has one church:

 Notre Dame de Saidnaya

Geography
Bsous is bordered by Aley, Kahale, Ain El Remaneh, Bdadoun, Wadi Chahrour, and Qmatiyeh.
It is 200 to 730 meters above sea level and 15 km from Beirut.
Bsous area is 2,457,139.61 m2 (sq meters)

Educational institutions
 No Schools at Bsous

Local Businesses
(by the road order)
Salon Fadi - Barbershop 
Patiliana - Patisserie
Acrystonex - Paint Factory
Rydex - Paint Factory
Abo Jerje - Pastry (Manakish)
Feghaly Market - Grocery and butcher
Station Saade (BP) - Gaz Station
Al-Saha Market - Grocery 
Eid Feghali - Distillerie 
Eid Feghali - Olive oil cold press 
Internet Cafe - Dany Boulos Abou Chedid
Mimo - Paint Factory
Restaurant Naji

Arts and Entertainment
Bsous Silk Museum

Streets and Landmarks
 Water fountain (El Ain)
 Virgin Mary Statue
 39 Bells

Notable Families
Families who have roots in Bsous are:
Sader

Emigration
Like most other Lebanese towns, a large proportion of people from Bsous emigrated to different places around the world. There are people from Bsous who permanently live in the United States of America, United Kingdom, France, Australia, Mexico, Brazil, Canada and elsewhere.
The pull factors for emigration are mostly: higher incomes, better availability of employment facilities and political stability.

Web Sites
The First News site From Bsous www.BsousOnline.info 
www.Bsous.com

Nicolas Sahyoun Abou Chedid
Doctorat ES Sciences Mathematics , Physics, Chemistry, Nuclear Physics
Notable figure Bsous | Professor 
 Dr.Habib Abou Sakr - politician 
 Dr. Haikal Feghali, MD
 PhD tony.m Sader
 Dr. Wadih Feghali
 Joseph Feghali, Grand Commander of the Papal Order of St Sylvester. i

Populated places in Mount Lebanon Governorate
Aley District